Choudhary Mehboob Ali Kaiser is an Indian politician and Member of Parliament from Khagaria Lok Sabha Constituency. He started his political career from Indian National Congress.
He was Member of Legislative Assembly where he represented Simri-Bakhtiarpur constituency for three terms. He also served as Cabinet Minister in Bihar Government. After being denied ticket by Indian National Congress for General Elections in 2014, he joined Lok Janshakti Party days before 2014 general election and successfully contested from Khagaria constituency.

Early life
Mehboob Ali Kaiser was born in Saharsa and he is son of Late Choudhary Salahuddin who was a former Cabinet minister of Bihar. He belongs to a Nawab family and is the grandson of Nawab Nazirul Hasan of Simri Bakhtiyarpur (erstwhile princely state). He served as Minister for Science and Technology & Minister of Higher Education in Bihar Government. He studied at Aligarh Muslim University.

Career
Mehboob Ali Kaiser was a Secretary in All-India Congress Committee (AICC) from 2007 to 2010.

He was the President of the Bihar Pradesh Congress Committee from 2010 to 2013.

References

Living people
Indian Muslims
Lok Janshakti Party politicians
People from Khagaria district
Politicians from Patna
Members of the Bihar Legislative Assembly
India MPs 2014–2019
Lok Sabha members from Bihar
People from Saharsa district
Aligarh Muslim University alumni
1958 births
India MPs 2019–present
Indian National Congress politicians from Bihar